Reddi Satyanarayana served as Member of the Legislative Assembly from Madugula Constituency in the Legislative Assembly of Andhra Pradesh state, India, from 1983 to 2004. His first term (1983-1984) was served as an independent, after which he served as a member of the Telugu Desam Party (TDP) until his defeat in the election of 2004.

Satyanarayana won Assembly elections from the Madugula constituency as a TDP candidate in 1984, 1985, 1989, 1994 and 1999. He lost the contest in that constituency in 2004 -when he stood as a candidate of the Praja Rajam Party.
   
He served as Cabinet minister for Animal Husbandry and Fisheries and has also been TTD Board Member, deputy leader of the TDLP under Nara Chandrababu Naidu.

References

Living people
Politicians from Hyderabad, India
Telugu Desam Party politicians
Year of birth missing (living people)